Events from the year 1991 in North Korea.

Incumbents
Premier: Yon Hyong-muk 
Supreme Leader: Kim Il-sung

Events

Births

 1 January - Sim Hyon-jin.
 18 January - Jang Song-hyok.
 8 February - Ri Yong-jik.
 2 August - O Hyok-chol.
 21 October - Kim Un-hyang.

References

 
North Korea
1990s in North Korea
Years of the 20th century in North Korea
North Korea